Hypsophrys nicaraguensis, the moga, is a species of cichlid native to the Atlantic slope of Central America, from Nicaragua to Costa Rica. The species is a popular aquarium fish and is traded under a variety of common names that include nickie, parrot cichlid, macaw cichlid, butterfly cichlid and nicaraguense. In Costa Rica it is known as a vieja.

Feeding
Hypsophrys nicaraguensis is able to protrude its jaw to 3.8% of its standard length limiting its diet to only 1% evasive prey.

Classification
The species was formerly the only representative of its genus, and is part of family Cichlidae in subfamily Cichlasomatinae.  However, the Poor man's tropheus, formerly Neetroplus nematopus, has also been placed into the genus Hypsophrys, as Hypsophrys nematopus.

Conservation
It occurs in the Maquenque National Wildlife Refuge.

References 

nicaraguensis
Fish of Central America
Fish of Nicaragua
Fishkeeping
Fish described in 1864
Taxa named by Albert Günther